Andrew Lionel Hichens (born 24 August 1936) is an English former first-class cricketer.

The son of Lionel Hichens and his wife, Mary Hermione Hichens (daughter of Sir Neville Lyttelton), he was born at Westminster in August 1936. His father was killed during The Blitz in 1940, while his eldest brother, John, was killed during the Normandy landings. He was educated at Winchester College between 1950 and 1954, before going up to Trinity College, Oxford. While studying at Oxford, he made his debut in first-class cricket for Oxford University against the Free Foresters at Oxford in 1957. He made two further first-class appearances for Oxford in 1959, against Essex and the Free Foresters. He took 6 wickets across his three matches, with best figures of 4 for 97. In addition to playing first-class cricket, Hichens also played minor counties cricket for Oxfordshire between 1957 and 1964, making 37 appearances in the Minor Counties Championship.

References

External links

1936 births
Living people
People from Westminster
People educated at Winchester College
Alumni of Trinity College, Oxford
English cricketers
Oxford University cricketers
Oxfordshire cricketers